Vitalia Diatchenko and Alexandra Panova were the defending champions, but both players chose not to participate.

Çağla Büyükakçay and Maria Sakkari won the title, defeating Elise Mertens and İpek Soylu in the final, 7–6(8–6), 6–4.

Seeds

Draw

References 
 Draw

Al Habtoor Tennis Challenge - Doubles
2015 in Emirati tennis